Robin Blackburn (born 1940) is a British historian, a former editor of New Left Review (1981–1999), and emeritus professor in the department of sociology at Essex University.

Background
Blackburn was educated at Hurstpierpoint College, Oxford University and the London School of Economics. Between 2001 and 2010 he was distinguished visiting professor of historical studies at The New School in New York City. He is an emeritus professor in the department of sociology at Essex University. He has been a regular contributor to New Left Review since 1962.

Blackburn is an author of essays on the collapse of Soviet Communism, on the "credit crunch" of 2008, and of books on the history of slavery and on social policy. His other works, American Crucible: Slavery, Emancipation and Human Rights (2011), The Making of New World Slavery: from the Baroque to the Modern, 1492-1800 (1997) and The Overthrow of Colonial Slavery, 1776-1848 (1988), offer an account of the rise and fall of colonial slavery in the Americas, contributing to the emerging field of "Atlantic history". He has also published histories of Social Security, and critiques of the "financialisation of everyday life" and of the privatisation of pension provision.

References

Selected works/articles

Towards Socialism, edited for the New Left Review (with Perry Anderson, 1966)
The Incompatibles: Trade Union Militancy and the Consensus (with Alexander Cockburn, 1967)

Student Power: problems, diagnosis, action (edited with Alexander Cockburn, 1969) 
Strategy for revolution [essays by Régis Debray, translated from the French] (editor, 1970)
Ideology in Social Science: Readings in Critical Social Theory (editor, 1972)
Explosion in a Subcontinent: India, Pakistan, Bangladesh, and Ceylon (editor, 1975)
Revolution and Class Struggle: A Reader in Marxist Politics (editor, 1977)
The Overthrow of Colonial Slavery, 1776–1848 (1988), 550 pp.
"Fin de Siecle", in After the Fall: The Failure of Communism and the Future of Socialism (editor, 1991) 
The Making of New World Slavery: From the Baroque to the Modern, 1492–1800 (1997), 600 pp.
Banking on Death: Or, Investing in Life — The History and Future of Pensions (2002), 500 pp.
"Haiti, Slavery and the Age of the Democratic Revolution", William and Mary Quarterly, 2006
Age Shock: How Finance Is Failing Us (2006), 280 pp.
"Economic Democracy: Meaningful, Desirable, Feasible?", Daedalus, Summer 2007 

The American Crucible: Slavery, Emancipation and Human Rights (2011), 460 pp.
Marx and Lincoln: An Unfinished Revolution (2011), 220 pp.

"Gunboat Abolitionism", New Left Review. II (79). May–June 2013
"Stuart Hall 1932–2014", New Left Review. II (86). March–April 2014

External links
Robin Blackburn
Guardian profile
Essex University homepage
[http://www.newschool.edu/NSSR/faculty.aspx?id=15958&DeptFilter=NSSR+Historical+Studies New School for Social Research (New York) Homepage]
Class forces in the Cuban Revolution book review in International Socialism 2:9 (1980)
Reviewing the millennia, book review in International Socialism, 2:86 (Spring 2000)
"What really ended slavery?", an interview with Blackburn in International Socialism'', 2:115 (Summer 2007)

1940 births
British historians
Alumni of the London School of Economics
Academics of the London School of Economics
Historians of colonialism
Historians of communism
Historians of the Caribbean
International Marxist Group members
Deutscher Memorial Prize winners
Living people
The New School faculty
British expatriates in the United States